Metatextuality is a form of intertextual discourse in which one text makes critical commentary on itself or another text. This concept is related to Gérard Genette's concept of transtextuality in which a text changes or expands on the content of another text.

References

See also
 Parody
 Post-structuralism
 Semiotics
 Translation

Intertextuality